Ersboda is a residential area in Umeå, Sweden.

External links
Ersboda at Umeå Municipality

Umeå